Filter is an American rock band formed in 1993 in Cleveland, Ohio, by singer Richard Patrick and guitarist and programmer Brian Liesegang. The band was formed when Patrick desired to start his own band after leaving Nine Inch Nails as their touring guitarist. Their debut album Short Bus was released in 1995 and ended up going platinum, largely due to the success of the single "Hey Man Nice Shot". After the album, the band would go through the first of many lineup changes, leaving Patrick as the only consistent member across all releases.

After Liesegang's departure in 1997, Patrick recorded a follow up album with the Short Bus touring band members, who became full-time members thereafter. The resulting effort, 1999's Title of Record, also went platinum driven by the success of the song "Take a Picture". A third album, The Amalgamut, was released in 2002 with the same members, though sales stalled with Patrick checking into rehab after years of heavy alcohol and drug abuse just as touring for the album had begun. The band went into hiatus while Patrick went to rehab, and then formed a new band, Army of Anyone, which released one self-titled album. After Army of Anyone went into hiatus, Patrick returned to Filter, releasing Anthems for the Damned in 2008, The Trouble with Angels in 2010, and The Sun Comes Out Tonight in 2013 with a revolving door of different musicians. A seventh studio album, Crazy Eyes, recorded with Patrick and another entirely new lineup, was released on April 8, 2016. In 2018, Brian Liesegang returned to Filter to work on a new album, reBus that was meant to musically be the follow up to Short Bus. Due to the PledgeMusic bankruptcy, reBus was shelved and Patrick has since been working on a new album They've Got Us Right Where They Want Us, At Each Other's Throats, scheduled for release in spring 2023.

History

Short Bus (1993–1998)
Richard Patrick played guitar with Nine Inch Nails during the touring for Pretty Hate Machine and in the music videos for Broken; he left the band while Trent Reznor was recording The Downward Spiral and began a new recording project with Brian Liesegang. Dubbing themselves Filter, they signed to Reprise Records in 1994 and recorded their first album, Short Bus, which was released in the following year. The album was commercially successful, and included the hit single "Hey Man Nice Shot". This song was somewhat controversial, as it was seen as capitalizing on the public suicide of Budd Dwyer. Kurt Cobain's suicide was widely rumored to have inspired the song, but the band denied this. The first single "Hey Man Nice Shot" was also included in the soundtrack for the movie Tales from the Crypt: Demon Knight in 1995 before Short Bus was released. In need of a live band to tour the album, Patrick and Liesegang recruited Geno Lenardo on guitar, Frank Cavanagh on bass, and Matt Walker on drums. They would all later be featured in the video for the album's second single, "Dose".

Between Filter's first and second albums, the band became known for their soundtrack contributions, The first of these tracks, "Thanks Bro", landed on the Songs in the Key of X: Music from and Inspired by the X-Files album. In 1996, Filter recorded and filmed the video for the song "Jurassitol", for The Crow: City of Angels soundtrack. They also released the home video Phenomenology in 1996, which showcased some of the band's live performances and music videos, as well as an interview with Patrick and Liesegang filmed in New Mexico.

Liesegang left in 1997 shortly after recording the Filter/Crystal Method collaboration "(Can't You) Trip Like I Do" for the Spawn movie soundtrack, due to creative differences with Patrick. In 1998, for The X-Files film soundtrack, Patrick decided to keep the Filter name and recorded a cover of Harry Nilsson's "One".

Title of Record (1999–2001)
Patrick continued with 1999's Title of Record with returning members Lenardo and Cavanagh, as well as Steve Gillis on drums, filling in the gap left by Walker after he left to work with The Smashing Pumpkins. Title of Record moved away from industrial rock somewhat, and resulted in the band's biggest hit, the mellow ballad "Take a Picture", along with other lesser-heard singles "Welcome to the Fold" and "The Best Things". The song "Take a Picture" is about a dispute on an aircraft, when Richard Patrick drunkenly stripped down to his boxers, alarming the other passengers. "Miss Blue" is said to have been about Smashing Pumpkins bassist D'arcy Wretzky. She can be heard on the songs "Cancer", and "Take a Picture".

The Amalgamut (2002)
2002 saw the release of The Amalgamut, featuring the singles "Where Do We Go from Here?" and "American Cliché". "The Only Way (Is the Wrong Way)" was also featured in the first wave of the Hummer H2 commercials that year and in the 2003 movie Tomb Raider: The Cradle of Life. Alan Bailey was recruited for live guitar when they set off to tour the album; however, the tour ended abruptly in a matter of weeks when Richard Patrick voluntarily checked himself into rehab. He has since tattooed his date of sobriety, September 28, 2002, on his forearm. Lenardo, Gillis and Cavanagh all left the group at this time.

Hiatus and side projects (2003–2007)
Richard Patrick was part of the supergroup The Damning Well, which has only released one track on the Underworld movie soundtrack in 2003. While rumors sparked that an entire album's worth of material was produced, Patrick later denied this in an interview, stating the bits and pieces of other rough tracks mostly wound up in Black Light Burns, save for the track "In Dreams" on the then upcoming Filter album Anthems for the Damned.

Army of Anyone, a second supergroup side project with drummer Ray Luzier and Stone Temple Pilots members Robert and Dean DeLeo, released its debut album on November 14, 2006. However, lack of sales of the album coupled with Richard Patrick's desire to do more work with Filter, led the band breaking up around mid-2007.

Anthems for the Damned (2007–2009)

As Army of Anyone wound down, Patrick began working on material for a new Filter album, to eventually be titled Anthems for the Damned. Released to the public in May 2008, it was more serious in tone than some expected and expresses more of his mixed emotions regarding the state of the world and the state of his life.

On March 7, 2008, it was announced that Frank Cavanagh had reunited with Filter and would play as a live member at the operation Myspace concert in Kuwait. It was confirmed at Operation MySpace that he would not be joining Filter on the full tour as he would be shipping off to Iraq in April. The only song played live during the performance of March 10 by Cavanagh, now a Sergeant and Paralegal in the U.S. Army Reserve, was the band's first mainstream hit, "Hey, Man, Nice Shot".

Patrick also announced a remix album to Anthems for the Damned on November 4, titled Remixes for the Damned. Remixes for the Damned was released on November 21, 2008 in the U.S. and Canada. The remix album was released internationally on December 1, 2008. The lead-off single was "I Keep Flowers Around (Love's Labour's Lost)".

A greatest hits album entitled The Very Best Things (1995–2008) was released March 31, 2009. It featured tracks from all four previous studio albums and various movie soundtrack contributions, but no new content. There are 14 tracks total, with some tracks being radio edits.

The Trouble with Angels (2009–2011)
Filter started working on a fifth album shortly after the release of the remix and greatest hits albums, with Bob Marlette as a producer. The album, as said by Richard Patrick, would be a lot heavier than Anthems for the Damned and is to have a song written for the Amalgamut on it. He also stated he would be moving away from the political lyrical content present in Anthems for the Damned. When asked about the direction of his upcoming music style in an interview with Suicide Girls on September 13, 2008, Patrick said, "Actually the stuff I'm writing right now for a record that I'm going to release sometime next year is actually way more heavy industrial, more electronic. There's probably not going to be that many live drums on it."

Richard Patrick has stated on the Filter website that he has been recording songs for movies recently. Filter covered the song "Happy Together" by The Turtles for the soundtrack to the movie The Stepfather (2009). The song features ambient sound with alternative metal. It was used in a promo for the seventh season of Criminal Minds and also a trailer for Baz Luhrmann's The Great Gatsby (2013).

Filter also contributed a new song "Fades Like a Photograph" for the soundtrack of the movie 2012 (2009). The song saw Patrick reuniting with former Filter co-conspirator, Brian Liesegang, who co-produced the track.

Through the end of 2009 and into 2010, Filter released a series of fourteen studio updates chronicling the progress made on the album. Each update touched on a certain part of the album process, such as "recording guitar parts" or "mixing the album". The last studio updates confirmed that the album recording had been completed. In their last studio video update, Richard Patrick showcased two clips from final mixed songs on iTunes that listed track listing and track lengths. While the video was legitimate, it was not the actual final track list, it was only a collection of new Filter songs on a playlist.

Filter released "The Inevitable Relapse", as their first single on May 26. The song was made available on the band's official website as a free digital download. The Trouble with Angels was released on August 17, 2010 on the Rocket Science Ventures record label.

After the album's release, the band also released a cover of ZZ Top's hit single "Gimme All Your Lovin'" which appears on the compilation ZZ Top: A Tribute from Friends.

The Sun Comes Out Tonight (2012–2013)

Patrick and Jonathan Radtke entered the studio with producer Bob Marlette in April 2012 to work on the sixth Filter studio album, titled The Sun Comes Out Tonight. The first single off the new album, "What Do You Say", was released on April 2, 2013. A track entitled "We Hate It When You Get What You Want" was available on the band's official site as a free download (for a limited time). The official track listing for the album was released on March 18, 2013. The album was released on June 4, 2013. Phil Buckman announced that he has left Filter on October 1, 2013 after finishing a tour in support of Stone Temple Pilots. Tim Kelleher, former bassist for Thirty Seconds to Mars joined Filter in October 2013.

Crazy Eyes (2014–2017)
In August 2014, Patrick announced his intention to work on a seventh studio album in late 2014. Later revealed to be titled Crazy Eyes, he aimed to keep recording time short, with the goal of releasing the album in 2015. Patrick states that he plans on writing again with Radtke, and this time also with touring members Hayden Scott and Tim Kelleher. On June 8, 2014, Patrick announced via Facebook that former guitarist Geno Lenardo has been extended an invitation to write music with the band. Patrick later commented that he was unsure if Lenardo would be able to commit to the formal recording sessions or not. Patrick later announced that he would be collaborating again with Liesegang, with whom he created Short Bus, and producer Ben Grosse, who produced Title of Record and The Amalgamut. Patrick also confirmed that the band would be in the studio in February 2015, and would then go on tour with Coal Chamber through March and April.

For some of album's recording sessions for the album, the band announced the ability to watch to livestream half-hour or hour intervals of the band in the studio, costing $175 for a half-hour, or $300 for a full hour.

On March 4, 2015, Radtke announced he had left the band to pursue other musical interests. Shortly after, Filter's Facebook page updated its members, indicating that an entirely new touring lineup would support Patrick, including Oumi Kapila, Ashley Dzerigian, and Chris Reeve.

On March 30, Filter launched a five-month campaign with PledgeMusic, offering fans the opportunity to have exclusive insights into the writing and recording of the new record. In a video update posted on PledgeMusic on December 4, Richard Patrick revealed the album is complete and is titled Crazy Eyes.

On December 18, Filter stated via Facebook that the album would be released on April 8, 2016.

They've Got Us Right Where They Want Us, At Each Other's Throats (2018–present) 

In early 2018, original member Brian Liesegang returned to Filter after 21 years and started working with Patrick on the band's 8th studio album. The latter mentioned that "Brian and I are making the official follow up to Short Bus (maybe), called Re-Bus." Liesegang offered an official statement regarding the project: "We are gearing up for official reboot of initial Filter. Working right at this instant together on lyrics. We have fun afternoons and focusing the loud and the pretty noise maelstrom. Gonna be a full length, and its hard or maybe not right to call it a sequel, as it's not so much that in that it is just a return to a certain approach and philosophy. Whatever. Not gonna overthink it, just do it. We'll figure that all out later... In the middle of it now."

In October 2018, the duo launched a PledgeMusic campaign to raise funds for production of the new album, tentatively titled ReBus. On July 18, 2019, Richard Patrick announced via Filter's Facebook that he and Liesegang would not release ReBus due to PledgeMusic's bankruptcy. Instead, Patrick announced he will focus on the twentieth anniversary re-release of Title of Record while he works on a new album, tentatively titled They've Got Us Right Where They Want Us, At Each Other's Throats with Radtke, who returned to the band.

On June 18, 2020, Filter debuted a music video on YouTube for the track "Thoughts and Prayers". Patrick had also stated in a story video on his Facebook the day before while promoting the release of the new single that the new working title for the upcoming album is Murica. The title track was released as a follow-up single on October 29, 2020.

A new single, "For the Beaten," was released on October 14, 2022. Patrick stated this was the first single for the new album coming in Spring 2023 on Golden Robot Records, that the album's title has reverted back to They've Got Us Right Where They Want Us, At Each Other's Throats, and that the two 2020 singles "Thoughts and Prayers" and "Murica" are not on the upcoming album.

Musical style and influences
Filter's sound has been described as industrial rock, post-grunge, industrial metal, alternative rock, hard rock, electronic rock, alternative metal, nu metal, grunge, and pop rock. The band's debut, Short Bus, melded grunge with mainstream industrial music; music critic Greg Kot remarked that the record "finds a middle ground between grunge's world-weary sense of melody and industrial rock's icy steel-pulse rhythms." The record's heavy use of drum machine was influenced by the sounds of Ministry and Big Black; Patrick's other influences during Filter's early career included Pantera, Skinny Puppy, Butthole Surfers, Helmet, Soundgarden and Deftones, as well as the drop D tuning. Liesegang parted ways with the band after Short Bus due to creative differences; he has sought to incorporate more electronic sounds while Patrick opted for a heavier, guitar-oriented direction. The band's second full-length album, Title of Record, incorporated more diverse elements and sounds, drawing from folk, worldbeat and psychedelia in addition to industrial and grunge. The Amalgamut marked a continuation of the sound of its predecessor with juxtaposing softer and heavier tracks, while 2008's Anthems for the Damned featured the band's trademark sound of "heavy rock" with "equal parts of grunge, industrial, and '80s rock". 2013's The Sun Comes Out Tonight introduced an update to Filter's sound with newly introduced harmonies and electronic elements. 2016's Crazy Eyes marked a sharper return to the industrial sound with Patrick's rediscovery of his appreciation for industrial acts such as Skinny Puppy and Ministry, as well as modern electronic artists such as deadmau5; he has referred to the sound on the record as "new industrial".

Members

Current members
 Richard Patrick – lead vocals, guitars, bass, programming, keyboards (1993–present)

Current live and session musicians
 Bobby Miller – bass (2019–present), keyboards, guitars (2014–2019)
 Jonathan Radtke – guitars, backing vocals (2011–2015, 2018–present)
 Elias Mallin – drums  (2012–2013, 2022-present) 

Former members
 Brian Liesegang – guitars, keyboards, programming (1993–1997, 2018–2019)
 Matt Walker – drums (1995–1997)
 Geno Lenardo – guitars (1995–2002)
 Frank Cavanagh – bass, backing vocals (1995–2002) 
 Steve Gillis – drums (1997–2002)
 Mitchell Marlow – guitars (2008–2010)
 John Spiker – bass (2008–2010)
 Mika Fineo – drums (2008–2012)
 Rob Patterson – guitars (2010–2011)
 Phil Buckman – bass, backing vocals (2010–2013)
 Jeff Fabb – drums (2013–2014)
 Tim Kelleher – bass (2013–2015)
 Oumi Kapila – guitars (2015–2017)
 Chris Reeve – drums (2015–2019)
 Ashley Dzerigian – bass (2015–2019)

Former live and session musicians
 Alan Bailey – guitars (2002)
John 5 – guitars (2008)
Josh Freese – drums (2008)
 Yogi Allgood – bass  (2011–2013) 
 Jeff Friedl – drums  (2012–2013) 
 Greg Garman – drums (2019–2021)

Timeline

Discography

Short Bus (1995)
Title of Record (1999)
The Amalgamut (2002)
Anthems for the Damned (2008)
The Trouble with Angels (2010)
The Sun Comes Out Tonight (2013)
Crazy Eyes (2016)
They've Got Us Right Where They Want Us, At Each Other's Throats (2023)

See also
List of alternative music artists
List of number-one dance hits (United States)
List of artists who reached number one on the U.S. Dance chart

References

External links

1993 establishments in Ohio
American alternative metal musical groups
American hard rock musical groups
American industrial metal musical groups
American industrial rock musical groups
Alternative rock groups from Ohio
Musical groups established in 1993
Musical groups reestablished in 2007
Musical groups disestablished in 2003
Musical groups from Cleveland
Musical groups from Illinois
Musical quartets
Nine Inch Nails
Trent Reznor
Warner Music Group artists
Wind-up Records artists